Ampelophaga nikolae is a moth of the  family Sphingidae. It is known from the Jiangxi-Fujian border in China.

References

nikolae
Moths described in 2007
Moths of Asia